Niğde Archaeological Museum is located in the centre of the Turkish provincial capital, Niğde between Dışarı Cami Sokak and Öğretmenler Caddesi. It contains objects found at sites in the surrounding area, including the tell of Köşk Höyük and the Graeco-Roman city of Tyana, both in the nearby town of Kemerhisar.

History 
From the Second World War until 1950, part of the collection of the Istanbul Archaeological Museum was kept in the Akmedrese, the main Quran school in Niğde, on Ak Medrese Caddesi. The building continued to be used as a museum after that. Because that space ceased to be sufficient for the collection, work began on a new museum building in 1971. The Akmedrese was closed in 1977and the new museum was opened to visitors on 12 November 1982. Soon the collection outgrew this building as well and it was accordingly rebuilt and renovated. The re-opening of the present museum occurred in 2001. The museum is or has been active in excavations at Köşk Höyük, Porsuk Hüyük, Kestel, Göllü Dağ, Andaval, Eskigümüş and Kınık Höyük.

Display 
The museum's objects are displayed in ix chronologically ordered rooms. Room 1 contains finds from prehistoric times, including Stone Age artefacts like obsidian spearpoints and arrowheads, which fall under the purview of the Obsidian Use Project. They come from Göllü Dağ, Köşk Höyük, Pınarbaşı Gölü, and other locations and date back to the 12th millennium BC. A large number of pottery objects from the sixth and fifth millennia BC are also displayed, most of which come from the excavations at Köşk Höyük. There is also a reconstruction of a house from this settlement.

Room 2 constrains objects from the early Bronze Age of the 3rd millennium BC, which is also the time of the Assyrian trade colonies (Karum). The objects come from excavations at Acemhöyük, near Çamardı, and in the prehistoric tin mines of Kestel.

In Room 2, there are steles and other objects from the Neo-Hittite/Luwian and Phrygian periods. The former are associated with the Hittite cities of the Nahita (Niğde) and Tuwanuwa (Kemerhisar) and the Neo-Hittite successor state of Tuwana. It depicts the weather god and was dedicated to Warpalawas, the King of Tuwana in the 8th century BC by his son Muwaharanis. Another stele from this period was found at Keşlik, about 30 km west of Niğde, near Altunhisar. It shows the weather god in a similar way to the Stele of Niğde, but its inscription is no longer legible. In addition to these objects there are also Luwian hieroglyphic inscriptions from Porsuk and Veliisa, door lions from Göllü Dağ and small objects and pottery from the Phrygian period. These objects come from excavations at Porsuk, Tepebağları, Kaynarca, Kemerhisar, and the Citadel of Niğde and they are dated to the first half of the 1st millennium BC.

Room 4 contains objects from the Graeco-Roman period, mostly from Tyana. Among these are inscriptions, statues, reliefs, a sarcophagus, small finds, and pottery. At the entrance to Room 5, there is a smaller room with coins from the Hellenistic, Roman, Byzantine and Islamic periods. In Room 5 itself, there are the mummies of a woman and four children which were found in the early Christian church of the Ihlara Valley and date to the 10th century AD. Room 6 has an ethnographic display with books, carpets, weapons and traditional costumes.

Gallery

References

External links 
 Niğde Museum
 Niğde Müzesi (Turkish)
 Many pictures of museum objects

Archaeological museums in Turkey
Buildings and structures in Niğde Province